Polynoncus patriciae is a species of hide beetle in the subfamily Omorginae found in Argentina and Uruguay.

References

patriciae
Beetles described in 1987
Beetles of South America